San Cristóbal is a city in the southern region of Dominican Republic. It is the municipal (municipio) capital of the San Cristóbal province. The municipality is located in a valley at the foothills of the mountains belonging to the Cordillera Central, between the Nigua and Nizao rivers. Within this municipality there is one municipal district (distrito municipal): Hato Damas. 

San Cristóbal was founded in the late 16th century. The Constitution of the Dominican Republic was signed in San Cristóbal in 1844. The city is also notable for being the birthplace of Rafael Trujillo, dictator from 1930 to 1961, who was killed by anti-dictatorial Dominicans on his way to San Cristóbal in 1961 as part of a successful plot to end his 30-year authoritarian and fascist regime.

History
The first explorations in San Cristóbal date back to the beginning of the conquest and colonization of Hispaniola with the second Voyage of Christopher Columbus in 1493. There were various haciendas, herds and ranches that existed in the Partido de los Ingenios de Nigua (today San Cristóbal) during the Spanish colonial era.

The formation of the town is credited to Miguel Díaz, who while fleeing from the punishment that awaited him from the authorities of "La Isabela" (the first city created by Columbus in America), due to a violent fight he had with another colonist, moved to this place where he married an indigenous woman by the name of Catalina, who according to legend, fearing being abandoned by her spouse, revealed to him the existence of a place where they found the gold deposits; Díaz then returned to La Isabela to inform the colonial authorities of his find.

Upon confirming the existence of gold on the banks of the Haina River, the Spanish proceeded to arrange for the settlement of a group of settlers and the installation of a fort called Buenaventura and later San Cristóbal, in honor of the admiral. Between the banks of the Haina and Nigua rivers, herds, haciendas and ranches were formed, as well as sugar mills that contributed to a notable development of the place. The Partido de los Ingenios de Nigua was the name given to the route between the indicated rivers, it was not until 1782 when it was elevated to the category of parish, constituting the San Gregorio de Nigua Church as the seat of the parish, which is undoubtedly one of the oldest construction of San Cristóbal still standing.

Rafael Trujillo, dictator from 1930 to 1961, was born in San Cristóbal in 1891 and had several properties in San Cristóbal among these were:

El Castillo El Cerro 
La Casa de Playa de Najayo o Casa de Marfil 
La Hacienda María o Casa Blanca
La Casa de Caoba (his favorite home)

All of these buildings are still standing, though in poor conditions. He built many monuments in his hometown, such as Balneario La Toma, and Parque Piedras Vivas – a park he ordered to be built from rocks and stones collected from each city of the Dominican Republic to honor himself (hence the park's name "Living Stones").

Geography

It is located near the coast of the Caribbean Sea. The topography is hilly as you go farther inland into the Cordillera Central mountain range.

Climate
San Cristóbal has a tropical monsoon climate (Köppen Am), with hot weather year-round and heavy rainfall from May to November, when hurricanes are a major risk.

Economy
Goya Foods has its Dominican Republic offices in San Cristóbal. 
The city has considerable sources of work, in which the Nestlé factory (maggi), the Sancela Family group plant, the Goya processing plant as well as the glass industrial park, the armory free zone, the CEDELCA piping factory, the tropical products factory (coco López) as well as the marmotech, Tecnotiles and Star marble marble plants, among other companies. However, due to its proximity to Santo Domingo, the population moves to work in the capital city, as well as in the towns of Bajo de Haina and Nigua. Currently in the city they are installing new businesses in its main streets and avenues.

The economic activities are influenced by the fact that it is the main city in the southern region and the fifth in the country and are industry (in San Cristóbal and the free zones of Bajo de Haina, Nigua and Villa Altagracia), small-scale agriculture (except citrus plantations in Villa Altagracia, coffee in the mountains and onions in the Najayo-Palenque plains) and port plantations (in Bajo de Haina and Palenque).

It has an intense tourist activity, especially national or internal tourists. The main centers are the beaches of Najayo, Palenque, El Balnearios de La Toma, Cuevas del Pomier and the Haina and Nizao rivers.

Currently, San Cristóbal is one of the cities with the best rates in the area of ​​telecommunications. It has the services of the main telephone companies in the country, as well as various cable and satellite television companies.

Education
There are a total of 72 educational centers and 92 center boards. The Educational District 04-03 has under its jurisdiction 56 Basic Centers, 10 Middle Schools, 6 Adult Centers, an Initial Education Center "National Council for Children and Adolescents (Conani)" and the Directorate of Attention to the Early Childhood (DAPI).

The large number of high school graduates in this city are concentrated in the Liceo Enedina Puello Renville, located in the Madre Vieja Sur sector. In said center there is a population of more than 1500 students in their morning, afternoon and evening shifts.

San Cristóbal has numerous educational centers at the basic, middle and higher levels, among which the UASD San ​​Cristóbal, also called CURSCEN, the Loyola Polytechnic Institute (recently endorsed and certified as a Loyola Specialized Institute of Higher Studies) stand out. teach technical engineering careers such as: Network and Telecommunications Engineering, Industrial Engineering, Electrical Engineering and Agricultural Engineering, with all the prestige of the Loyola Polytechnic Institute.), Loyola Cooperative School, Francisco José Peynado Polytechnic Institute, Santa Rita School, Center for Ronda Del Saber Studies, Baptist School, San Rafael School, English Learning Center, Canaan Academy, etc. Studies are offered at the pre-initial, basic, secondary and higher levels. A high percentage of the young population moves to Santo Domingo to study, due to the diversity of offers and the proximity.

It also has a technical-professional training center, INFOTEP (National Institute for Technical-Professional Training), its teaching is partially carried out at the Loyola Polytechnic Institute.

Notable residents

Military and politics
 Antonio Duvergé, Dominican general of French origin who served in the Dominican War of Independence.
 Temístocles Montás, president of the Dominican Liberation Party (PLD)
 Rafael Leonidas Trujillo, Dominican dictator who ruled the Dominican Republic from February 1930 until his assassination in May 1961

Music
 Jochy Hernandez, Merengue singer

Sports
 Miguel Andújar, third baseman for the Pittsburgh Pirates of Major League Baseball (MLB)
 Santiago Casilla, former MLB relief pitcher
 José Guillén, former MLB outfielder
 Francisco Liriano, former MLB pitcher
 Rigoberto Mendoza (born 1992), professional basketball player
 Raúl Mondesí, former MLB outfielder and former mayor of San Cristobal (2010–16)
 Hector Neris, MLB relief pitcher
 Iván Nova, pitcher for the SSG Landers of the KBO League
 Michael Pineda, MLB pitcher
 Al Reyes, former MLB pitcher
 José Rijo, former MLB pitcher
 Sixto Sánchez, pitcher in the Miami Marlins organization
 Ervin Santana, former MLB pitcher
 Pedro Strop, MLB pitcher

Sites of interest
Diego Caballero Sugar Mill
La Toma de San Cristóbal
Pomier Caves
Parque Piedras Vivas
Playa Palenque
Playa Najayo
Ingenio CAEI
Fuerte Resoli.

Sectors
5 de abril 
Canastica 
El Pomier 
Hatillo 
La Cruz
La Guandulera 
La Suiza 
La Toma 
Las Flores 
Lava Pies 
Los Cacaitos 
Los Molinas
Los Montones
Los Corozos 
Zona verde
Los Novas 
Madre Vieja Norte 
Madre Vieja Sur 
Medina
Moscú 
Pueblo Nuevo 
Sabana Toro
Villa Fundación 
Villa Liberación 
Villa Valdez
Zona Verde
Mira Cielo
Villa Mercedes 
Las Arecas
Villa Liberación
Najayo Arriba
Yaguate
Cambita
Doña Ana
Hatillo
Nicole
San Isidro
Nigua
Frank Reyna

References

Populated places in San Cristóbal Province
Municipalities of the Dominican Republic